Centruroides tecomanus is a species of scorpion in the family Buthidae. It is native to Mexico.

References

Buthidae
Scorpions described in 1932
Endemic scorpions of Mexico
Centruroides